Calling Cat-22 is a short-lived flash animation comedy series created by Matthew Schwartz through Turner Studios for the Cartoon Network Wedgies series, produced by Steve Patrick, and directed by Jai Anthony-Lewis Husband; writing honors were shared by Schwartz and Patrick. The series theme was performed by electronic pop duo Nova Social. The series debuted  on June 1, 2008 on the Cartoon Network channel in the intervals of The Marvelous Misadventures of Flapjack; and was used thereafter as an interstitial until 2010, when it was moved to Cartoon Network's sister-network Boomerang, where it ran till 2015. The cartoon series consists of five two-and-a-half-minute episodes: "Sniff," "Hydrant," "Flying Discs," "Stink," and "Bones."

In form, the series is a parody of spy thrillers of the James Bond variety, in which the eponymous Cat-22, an agent for a secret organization of cats directed by Gato Primo (voiced by Garrett Fisher), seeks to discover the mysteries associated with the life of dogs (who, despite their oblivious imbecility in the series, are treated by the cats like agents of a hostile superpower or enemy agency).

Each episode's plot follows a set formula.  22, (a rail-thin black cat in a stereotypical "men-in-black"-style secret agent suit) is found relaxing in some foreign venue, until given a briefcase containing an assignment by Agent Andrew (a short, stout black cat with a poncy English accent); the briefcase conveys a communication from Gato Primo to investigate some (usually disgusting) feature of canine life, invariably concluding with a Mission: Impossible-like warning from Gato that "This briefcase will self-destruct..." and 22's subsequent resulting injury.  Thereupon, 22 is seen in "disguise" (a brown beanie with doggie ears), attempting to gain information from his moronic canine friend, Guthrie (David Markus) (and, on occasion, the brutal bulldog, Percy); invariably, complications follow, involving comic injury and humiliation, which are generally only heightened by Gato's attempts to extract him from the situation. Typically, Andrew generally reappears at the end of the episode to reassure 22 that he will soon be back on assignment, whereupon 22 attempts to escape (often resulting in further injury).

Episodes

Notes and references

External links
 

Cartoon Network original programming
2008 American television series debuts
2008 American television series endings
2000s American animated television series
American children's animated comedy television series
Animated television series about cats